James Pike (1913–1969) was an American Episcopal bishop.

James Pike may also refer to:

James Shepherd Pike (1811–1882), American journalist
James Pike (politician) (1818–1895), U.S. Representative from New Hampshire
James E. Pike (1892–1969), Australian jockey during the 1930s
Jim Pike, American musician (The Lettermen)

See also
James Pyke (disambiguation)